The Amazing Race 8 (also known as The Amazing Race: Family Edition) is the eighth season of the American reality television show The Amazing Race. As opposed to other seasons of this series, which featured pairs of adults with a pre-existing relationship, this season featured ten families of four and allowed the participation of minors as young as eight years old.

The season premiered on CBS on Tuesday, September 27, 2005, and concluded on Tuesday, December 13, 2005.

Siblings Nick, Alex, Megan, and Tommy Linz were the winners of this season; while father Wally Branson and his three daughters, Beth, Lauren, and Lindsay, finished in second place; and widow Linda Weaver and her three children, Rebecca, Rachel, and Rolly, finished in third.

Production

Development and filming

The eighth season of The Amazing Race spanned . This season placed much less emphasis on international travel as numerous legs were contained within the continental United States, and all locations were in North America, with Panama and Costa Rica visited for the first time. Filming took place between July 7, 2005, and July 31, 2005.

Route Markers were colored yellow and white with black lining in contrast to the yellow and red markers used in all other seasons. As with The Amazing Race 7, the winners of this season were revealed in an online betting scandal just before the finale aired.

For this season, the supplied credit card covered not only airfare, but also gasoline, which otherwise would have had to be purchased with cash. This rule change was made necessary by the fact that most of the transportation took place in automobiles rather than airplanes.

The limits on individual Roadblock attempts, introduced in season six, did not apply for this season. Furthermore, some Roadblocks in this edition required the participation of two team members.

During Leg 1, Renee Rogers fell at the starting line and suffered a concussion. She did not realize the severity of the injury until she went to a hospital after being eliminated during the next leg.

Kevin O'Connor and Drew Feinberg from season 1 made a cameo appearance during the first leg handing out clues to teams in New York City at a hot dog stand.

This season featured a visit to New Orleans in Legs 4 and 5, where filming occurred about a month before Hurricane Katrina struck the region. The episodes aired after the hurricane had devastated the region. A special message was inserted at the beginning of the episodes, including one spoken by Phil Keoghan, dedicating them to the victims and to those helping with the recovery. The Schroeder family, who were from New Orleans, had befriended the Rogers family from Shreveport in the northern part of Louisiana during the season. As Hurricane Katrina neared landfall, the Rogers family offered the Schroeders safety at their home. Hurricane Katrina wiped out the Schroeders' home and most of their possessions, and after staying with the Rogerses for about two weeks, they were able to find more permanent housing in Baton Rouge, and most of the other teams from this season chipped in to help the family.

According to an interview with Wally Bransen on RFF Radio, producers originally planned a leg in Belize, but had to cancel it due to Hurricane Emily.

Cast

This season's cast consisted of ten teams of four family members each. 

Future appearances
Stassi Schroeder later appeared in the Oxygen reality series Queen Bees. Schroeder later appeared on the Bravo reality series Vanderpump Rules as a part of that cast for eight seasons. In 2011, Brian and Marion Paolo appeared on the HGTV reality show House Hunters. Billy and Carissa Gaghan wrote introductions for My Ox is Broken, a book about The Amazing Race.

Results
The following teams are listed with their placements in each leg. Placements are listed in finishing order. 
A  placement with a dagger indicates that the team was eliminated. 
An  placement with a double-dagger indicates that the team was the last to arrive at a pit stop in a non-elimination leg. As a penalty, they were stripped of their money, bags, and possessions other than their passports and the clothes they had on upon checking in, and they received no money at the start of the next leg.
 An italicized placement indicates a team's placement at the midpoint of a double leg.
A  indicates that the team won the Fast Forward. 
A  indicates that the team used the Yield and a  indicates the team on the receiving end of the Yield.

Notes

Race summary

Leg 1 (New York → New Jersey → Pennsylvania)

Episode 1: "Go, Mommy, Go! We Can Beat Them!" (September 27, 2005)
Prize: US$20,000 cash (awarded to the Godlewski Family)
Eliminated: Black Family
Locations
New York City, New York (Empire–Fulton Ferry State Park) (Starting Line)
New York City (SoHo – Eastern Mountain Sports)
New York City (East 91st Street – Hot Dog Stand)
 Washington Crossing, Pennsylvania (Washington Crossing Historic Park) & Titusville, New Jersey (Washington Crossing State Park)
Philadelphia, Pennsylvania (Fairmount Park – Belmont Plateau)
Mount Joy (Brubaker Family Farm) 
Lancaster (Rohrer Family Farm) 
Episode summary
Teams set off from Empire–Fulton Ferry State Park and had to drive to Eastern Mountain Sports in SoHo, where they had to pick up camping gear and their next clue. Teams were directed to find a "frank" on East 91st Street between Park and Lexington, where Kevin & Drew from the first season, working as hot dog vendors, handed them their next clue.
At Washington Crossing Historic Park in Pennsylvania, teams had to recreate George Washington's crossing of the Delaware River by choosing a rowboat to cross the Delaware River to Washington Crossing State Park in New Jersey. Once across, they had to retrieve a 13-star flag, row back to the Pennsylvania shore, and observe a flag-folding ceremony before receiving their next clue.
At Belmont Plateau in Fairmount Park, teams had to pitch a tent as quickly as possible. Once an Eagle Scout approved the tent's assembly, teams were given a departure time for the next morning, when they had to drive to the Brubaker Family Farm in Mount Joy.
 This season's first Detour was a choice between Build It or Buggy It. In Build It, teams had to use a set of provided materials to construct a functioning scale model of a watermill and then use two buckets of water to power the mill in order to receive their next clue. In Buggy It, two members from each team had to pull a traditional Amish buggy along a  course while the other two rode inside in order to receive their next clue.
After completing the Detour, teams had to check in at the pit stop: the Rohrer Family Farm in Lancaster, Pennsylvania.

Leg 2 (Pennsylvania → Washington, D.C. → Virginia)

Episode 2: "How Do We Know We Aren't Going to Get Shot?" (October 4, 2005)
Prize: A trip to the Fairmont Southampton in Bermuda (awarded to the Weaver Family)
Eliminated: Rogers Family
Locations
Lancaster (Rohrer Family Farm) 
York (Shoe House Road – Haines Shoe House)
Washington, D.C. (United States Capitol – Reflecting Pool)
Washington, D.C. (3rd Street)
Washington, D.C. (West Potomac Park – Tidal Basin) 
Middleburg, Virginia (Welbourne Manor)  
Episode summary
At the beginning of this leg, teams were instructed to drive to York, Pennsylvania, and find the Haines Shoe House, where one team member had to climb to the top of a giant shoe in order to retrieve their next clue, which directed them to drive to the Capitol Reflecting Pool in Washington, D.C. Teams then had to find a limousine parked on 3rd Street, where an unseen contact passed them a briefcase, which they had take to the Tidal Basin.
 In this season's first Roadblock, one team member had to search for one of ten spies among 50 people carrying an identical briefcase around the Tidal Basin. To identify the spy, they had to whisper a code phrase ("The sky is blue"), but only a spy would respond with the counterphrase ("The sea is green"). After they swapped briefcases, team members found their next clue inside, which directed teams to travel to the Welbourne Manor in Middleburg, Virginia.
 This leg's Detour at an American Civil War reenactment was a choice between Heat of the Battle or Heat of the Night. In Heat of the Battle, teams had to use stretchers to transport five "wounded soldiers" to a surgical tent. In Heat of the Night, teams had to roll a barrel of oil to a workstation, where they had to fill 20 oil lamps. They then had to take the lamps to the quartermaster and light them all in order to receive their next clue.
After completing the Detour, teams were given a Civil War regimental flag, which they had to bring to the nearby pit stop.
Additional notes
The task with the briefcase swap was later revisited on season 22 as a Switchback.

Leg 3 (Virginia → South Carolina → Alabama)

Episode 3: "I Don't Kiss I Make Out" (October 11, 2005)
Prize: Gasoline for life for each team member (awarded to the Bransen Family)
Eliminated: Aiello Family
Locations
Middleburg, Virginia (Welbourne Manor) 
 Washington, D.C. → Charleston, South Carolina
Charleston (The Battery)
Mount Pleasant (Wando Shrimp Co.)  Ridgeville (Ridgeville Mud Run) 
 Charleston (Charleston Visitor Center) → Huntsville, Alabama
Huntsville (U.S. Space & Rocket Center – Edward O. Buckbee Hangar) 
Huntsville (U.S. Space & Rocket Center – Rocket Park)
Huntsville (U.S. Space & Rocket Center – Space Shuttle Pathfinder) 
Episode summary
At the beginning of this leg, teams were instructed to fly to Charleston, South Carolina. Once in Charleston, teams had to drive themselves to The Battery in order to find their next clue at a gazebo.
 This leg's Detour was a choice between Forrest Gump or Muddy Waters. In Forrest Gump, teams had to drive  to the Wando Shrimp Company in Mount Pleasant, South Carolina, and board a shrimp boat. They then had to de-head  of shrimp by hand in order to receive their next clue. In Muddy Waters, teams had to drive  to Ridgeville and find the Ridgeville Mud Run. There, teams drove an SUV one lap through a mud obstacle course, including a  gully filled with mud, in order to receive their next clue. If they got stuck, they had to wait to be towed out before beginning the course again.
After completing the Detour, teams were instructed to go to the Charleston Visitor Center to sign-up for one of two charter buses to a mystery destination (Huntsville, Alabama).
 In this leg's Roadblock, two team members had to ride in a centrifuge and endure a gravitational pull of 3.2g in order to receive their next clue.
After completing the Roadblock, teams walked almost  to the nearby Rocket Park. There, teams had to enter the space mission, search for a computer, and log in to receive a video clue from Phil, instructing them to travel on foot to the pit stop at the Space Shuttle Pathfinder.

Leg 4 (Alabama → Mississippi → Louisiana)

Episode 4: "Think Like an Office Chair" (October 18, 2005)
Prize: A Universal Orlando Resort package at Orlando, Florida (awarded to the Bransen Family)
Eliminated: Schroeder Family
Locations
Huntsville (U.S. Space & Rocket Center – Space Shuttle Pathfinder) 
Anniston (World's Largest Office Chair)
Talladega (International Motorsports Hall of Fame)
Talladega (Talladega Superspeedway)
Hattiesburg, Mississippi (Southern Colonel Mobile Homes)
Richland (BP Gas Station)
Madisonville, Louisiana (Fairview-Riverside State Park) 
New Orleans (Preservation Hall) 
Episode summary
At the beginning of this leg, teams were instructed to drive themselves to Anniston, Alabama, where one team member had to climb to the top of the World's Largest Office Chair in order to retrieve their next clue. Teams then had to drive to the International Motorsports Hall of Fame in Talladega, where they had to search the museum for their next clue, which sent them to the Talladega Superspeedway. Teams had to choose a party bike and complete one  lap around the track in order to receive their next clue.
Teams had to find the "Southern Colonel" in Hattiesburg, Mississippi, which they had to figure out was a mobile home dealership. When they arrived, teams had to search through 37 mobile homes for one of three departure times the next morning. They then spent the night in the mobile home and found their next clue on the windshield of their car the next morning.
At a gas station in Richland, team had to find their next clue, which instructed teams to drive to the "Pelican State", which they had figure out was Louisiana, and find their next clue at Fairview-Riverside State Park in Madisonville.
 This leg's Detour was a choice between Work or Play. In Work, teams had to don flannel clothing and then use a two-man saw to cut four slices  in diameter off a log in order to receive their next clue. In Play, teams had to don traditional New Orleans clothing and make their way by canoe to a riverboat, where they had to play a game of blackjack against a professional dealer. When they won three rounds, the dealer gave them their next clue.
After completing the Detour, teams had to drive themselves to New Orleans and check in at the pit stop: Preservation Hall, in the French Quarter of New Orleans.

Leg 5 (Louisiana → Panama)

Episode 5: "We're Getting Out of the Country, Girls" (October 25, 2005)
Prize: A Gamboa Rainforest Resort package at the Panama Canal (awarded to the Paolo Family)
Locations
New Orleans (Preservation Hall) 
 New Orleans → Panama City, Panama
 Gamboa (Smithsonian Tropical Research Institute Gamboa Field Station) & Barro Colorado Island (Smithsonian Tropical Research Institute)
 Panama City (Panama Canal – Pier 14) 
 Panama City (Casco Viejo  El Parque Metropolitan) 
 Panama City (Estadio Juan Demóstenes Arosemena) 
 Panama City (Panama Canal – Miraflores Locks) 
Episode summary
At the beginning of this leg, teams were instructed to fly to Panama City, Panama. Once in Panama, teams had to make their way to the Smithsonian Tropical Research Institute in Gamboa, where they boarded a boat to Barro Colorado Island and had to search for a scientist, who gave them their next clue. Afterward, teams had to return to Gamboa by boat and find a red devil bus, known locally as a diablo rojo, which served as their means of transportation for the rest of this leg.
 For this season's only Fast Forward, one team had to find a crane at the Pacific side of the Panama Canal in Balboa. Once there, the family had to split into pairs and each perform a tandem bungee jump. The Paolo Family won the Fast Forward.
 This leg's Detour was a choice between Rhythm or Coos. In Rhythm, teams had to travel to Casco Viejo and collect four musical instruments from four different locations: a saxophone, a trumpet, a conga drum, and a trombone. They then had to deliver them to Take Five Jazz and Wine, where they received their next clue. In Coos, teams traveled to El Parque Metropolitan, where they had to use binoculars to search the rainforest canopy for wooden replicas of five local bird species shown on a provided bird identification chart. Once they found a bird, they had to circle the correct species on the chart. When they'd circled five correct birds, they had to present the card to a bird expert in order to receive their next clue.
After completing the Detour, teams had to travel to the Estadio Juan Demóstenes Arosemena in order to receive their next clue.
 In this leg's Roadblock, one team member to had to play baseball against a local little-league champion. If they got a base hit or home run, the umpire gave them their next clue, but if a player failed after three pitches, they had to go to the end of the line in order to try again.
Teams had to check in at the pit stop: the Miraflores Locks on the Panama Canal.
Additional notes
This was a non-elimination leg.

Leg 6 (Panama → Costa Rica)

Episode 6: "I'm Sick of Doing Stuff I Can't Do" (November 1, 2005)
Prize: A choice of a Segway HT, Vespa, jet ski, or all-terrain vehicle for each team member (awarded to the Paolo Family)
Eliminated: Gaghan Family
Locations
Panama City (Panama Canal – Miraflores Locks) 
 Panama City → San José, Costa Rica
San José (Parqueo Publico Adrian)
Poás Volcano National Park (Poás Volcano)
Alajuela (Doka Estate)  
Jacó (Roca Loca Surf Shop)
Manuel Antonio National Park (Rainmaker Park)  Parrita (Frutas Selectas del Tropico) 
Quepos (Malecon) 
Episode summary
At the beginning of this leg, teams were instructed to go to the Terminal Nacional de Transporte, where they had to pull a departure time for one of two charter buses leaving thirty minutes apart to San José, Costa Rica. Once in San José, teams had to make their way to the Parqueo Publico Adrian, where they found their next clue directing them to Poás Volcano National Park in order to find their next clue. Teams then had to drive to the Doka Estate in Alajuela in order to find their next clue.
 In this leg's Roadblock, one team member had to search through an  pile of coffee beans in order to find the one red bean which they could exchange for their next clue. 
Teams had to drive to the Roca Loca Surf Shop in Jacó and find a man named Javier in order to receive their next clue.
 This leg's Detour was a choice between Relic or Ripe. In Relic, teams traveled to a nearby rainforest within Manuel Antonio National Park, where they had to search for four Mayan relics. Once they delivered each of these relics to an archaeologist, they received their next clue. In Ripe, teams traveled to the Frutas Selectas del Tropico banana plantation, where they had to gather fifteen bushels of bananas and load them onto hanging tracks. Teams then had to use a local pulley-system to haul the bananas to the distribution center in order to receive their next clue.
Teams had to check in at the pit stop: the Malecon in Quepos.
Additional notes
 The Paolo Family chose to Yield the Weaver Family.

Leg 7 (Costa Rica → Arizona)

Episode 7: "You Look Ridiculous" (November 8, 2005)
Prize: A trip to Belize (awarded to the Godlewski Family)
Locations
Quepos (Malecon) 
Quepos (Playa Maracas)
Grecia (Iglesia de Metal )
Sarchí (Taller Eloy Alfaro)  Grecia (Ingenio La Argentina & Fabrica Nacional de Licores) 
 San José → Phoenix, Arizona
Chandler (Bondurant SuperKart School) 
Fort McDowell (Fort McDowell Adventures) 
Episode summary
At the start of this leg, teams traveled on foot to Playa Maracas, where one team member had to swim to a buoy in order to get their next clue directing them to the Iglesia de Metal in Grecia, where they found their next clue.
 This leg's Detour was a choice between Brush or Barrel. In Brush, teams had to travel to Taller Eloy Alfaro in Sarchí. Once there, they had to choose two partially painted cartwheels, and use the provided pattern to fill in the missing section. When they finished decorating the wheel, they received their clue. Once the sugarcane was delivered, they had to search a warehouse to find a marked barrel-rack hidden among dozens of rum barrels in order to receive their next clue.
Teams were then instructed to fly to Phoenix, Arizona. Once in Phoenix, teams had to make their way to the Bondurant SuperKart School in Chandler in order to find their next clue.
 In this leg's Roadblock, one team member had to drive a racing go-kart for 50 laps around the race track in order to receive their next clue.
Teams had to check in at the pit stop: Fort McDowell Adventures in Fort McDowell.
Additional notes
This was a non-elimination leg.

Leg 8 (Arizona)

Episode 8: "I Don't Roll with the Punches, I Punch" (November 8, 2005)
Prize: A Jay-Flight 27 B.H. Travel Trailer (awarded to the Godlewski Family)
Eliminated: Paolo Family
Locations
Fort McDowell (Fort McDowell Adventures) 
Mesa (Phoenix–Mesa Gateway Airport – Fighter Combat International) 
Grand Canyon National Park (Grand Canyon – Lipan Point)
Page (Glen Canyon Dam) 
 Glen Canyon National Recreation Area (Horseshoe Bend) 
 Page (Antelope Point) → Lake Powell (Houseboat) 
Episode summary
At the beginning of this leg, teams were instructed to drive to Fighter Combat International in Mesa, Arizona.
 In this leg's Roadblock, one team member had to fly in a fighter plane and, following the pilot's direction, perform a 360-degree loop in order to receive their next clue.
After completing the Roadblock, teams had to drive to the Grand Canyon, where they found their next clue at Lipan Point. Teams then had to drive to the Glen Canyon Dam, where they had to choose a guide, who took them to their next clue atop the dam.
 This leg's Detour was a choice between Bearing or Bailing. For both Detours options, teams traveled by motorized raft to Horseshoe Bend along the Colorado River. In Bearing, teams had to choose one of five color-coded cards with unique compass bearings. They then followed the bearing to the next card and repeated the process until they obtained four cards. Once teams had all four cards, they could exchange them for the next clue. In Bailing, teams had to use the provided tools to bail water out of a submerged boat until it was light enough to carry ashore, after which, teams received their next clue.
After completing the Detour, teams were directed to Antelope Point, where they headed down a path to Lake Powell and raced on motorboats to their pit stop: a marked houseboat.
Additional notes
Legs 7 and 8 aired back-to-back as a special two-hour episode.

Leg 9 (Arizona → Utah)

Episode 9: "How's That Face Feel?" (November 22, 2005)
Prize: A trip for four to the Teton Mountain Lodge in Jackson Hole, Wyoming (awarded to the Linz Family)
Locations
Lake Powell (Houseboat) 
 Monument Valley (John Ford's Point & Elephant Butte)
Moab, Utah (Gemini Bridges – Bull Canyon) 
Green River (Green River State Park)
Heber City (970 Little Sweden Road)
Park City (Utah Olympic Park)  
Salt Lake City (Salt Lake City Public Library) 
Episode summary
At the beginning of this leg, teams were instructed to drive to Monument Valley. At John Ford's Point, two team members from each family had to ride in a helicopter to Elephant Butte, where they retrieved the next clue from the summit. Teams were then directed to drive to Moab, Utah.
 This leg's Detour was a choice between Ride Down or Drop Down. In Ride Down, teams had to ride bicycles along a  course down the mountain and then to Bull Canyon in order to retrieve their next clue. In Drop Down, teams had to complete a two-stage rappel, totaling , in order to reach Bull Canyon and their next clue.
After completing the Detour, teams traveled to Green River State Park in Green River for an overnight rest. Teams' departure times were determined by the order of their arrival. The next day, teams had to drive to Heber City and find Bart the Bear, who had the next clue in his mouth. Teams were then directed to the Utah Olympic Park in Park City.
 In this leg's Roadblock, one team member had to put on skis and descend a  ski-jump training ramp into an Olympic pool in order to receive their next clue.
Teams had to check in at the pit stop: the rooftop of the Salt Lake City Public Library in Salt Lake City.
Additional notes
 The Linz Family chose to Yield the Weaver Family.
This was a non-elimination leg.

Leg 10 (Utah → Wyoming → Montana)

Episode 10: "Don't Talk To Me Like I Was An Animal Or Something" (November 29, 2005)& Episode 11: "The Family Christmas Card" (December 6, 2005)
Prize: A 2006 full-size Buick Lucerne luxury sedan (awarded to the Bransen Family)
Eliminated: Godlewski Family
Locations
Salt Lake City (Salt Lake City Public Library) 
Park City (Park City High School)
Heber City (Heber Valley Railway) 
Bonneville Salt Flats (Tree of Utah)
Garden City (Bear Lake Rendezvous Beach)
Big Piney, Wyoming (Dunham Ranch) 
Yellowstone National Park (Old Faithful)
Moran (Pinto Ranch) 
Dubois (Turtle Ranch) 
Cody (Irma Hotel)
Red Lodge, Montana (Red Lodge Mountain Golf Course) 
Absarokee (Larry Arnold's Green Meadow Ranch) 
Episode summary (Episode 10)
At the beginning of this leg, teams were instructed to drive to Park City High School in Park City, Utah. There, teams helped to inflate a hot air balloon and then flew across the Utah countryside. After landing, teams received their next clue directing them to the Heber Valley Railway.
 This leg's first Detour was a choice between Spike It or Steam It. In Spike It, teams used historic materials and tools to complete a  section of railway track. In both Detours, teams had to have their work approved by a railway engineer before they could receive their next clue.
After completing the Detour, teams had to travel to the Tree of Utah sculpture at the Bonneville Salt Flats and search the grounds for their next clue. Teams then drove to Bear Lake Rendezvous Beach in Garden City, where they had to spend the night. Teams' departure times were determined by the order of their arrival. The next morning, teams had to drive to the Dunham Ranch in Big Piney, Wyoming, where they found their next clue.
 In this leg's first Roadblock, two team members had to mount horses and herd six cattle  from a holding pen into a corral in order to receive their next clue.
After completing the Roadblock, the teams' clue stated "I'm old, I'm faithful". Teams had to figure out that their next location was Old Faithful at Yellowstone National Park. Teams had to wait for the geyser to erupt before receiving their next clue, which instructed teams to drive to the Pinto Ranch in Moran. There, teams met Phil, who told them that the leg was not over before handing them their next clue.
Episode summary (Episode 11)
Teams were instructed to drive to the Turtle Ranch in Dubois. 
 This leg's second Detour was a choice between Pioneer Spirit or Native Tradition. In Pioneer Spirit, teams had to attach four wheels to a covered wagon, hook up a team of horses, and drive along a  course in order to receive their next clue. In Native Tradition, teams had to use traditional materials and tools to build a teepee in order to receive their next clue.
After completing the second Detour, teams were given the clue "Do you know the hotel named after Buffalo Bill's daughter?" Teams had to figure out that they needed to go to the Irma Hotel in Cody. At the hotel, teams had to don period clothing and take a picture with a Buffalo Bill impersonator. Once the photo was developed, teams received their next clue, which directed them to drive to Red Lodge, Montana. At the Red Lodge Mountain Golf Course, teams had to find the "Tenth Tee" in order to retrieve their next clue.
 In this leg's second Roadblock, two team members had to choose a colored flag and attach it to a golf cart. They then had to search the golf course for balls the same color as their flag. Once they found all of the balls, they received their next clue.
Teams had to check in at the pit stop: Larry Arnold's Green Meadow Ranch in Absarokee, Montana. 
Additional notes
Leg 10 was a double leg that aired over two episodes.

Leg 11 (Montana → Canada → New York)

Episode 12: "25 Days, 50 Cities, And More Than 600 Consecutive Hours Together as a Family" (December 13, 2005)
Winners: Linz Family
Second Place: Bransen Family
Third Place: Weaver Family
Locations
Absarokee (Larry Arnold's Green Meadow Ranch) 
 Billings → Montreal, Canada
Montreal (Victoria Square – Square-Victoria Metro Station)
Montreal (Underground City – Centre CDP Capital Building Passageway)
Sainte-Anne-de-Bellevue (McGill University – Glenfinnan Rink  Morgan Arboretum) 
Montreal (Saint Helen's Island – Montreal Biosphere)
Montreal (Trapezium) 
Montreal (Parc Olympique – Stade Olympique)
 Montreal → Toronto
Toronto (CN Tower)
Toronto (Polson Pier)
Toronto (Queens Quay Sailing and Powerboating & Harbourfront Centre – Kajama or Bata Shoe Museum) 
 Queenston (Queenston Boat Ramp – Whirlpool Jet Boat Tours) → Niagara River (Niagara Gorge)
 Lewiston, New York (Joseph Davis State Park)  
Episode summary
At the beginning of this leg, teams were instructed to fly to Montreal, Canada. Once in Montreal, teams had to travel to the Square-Victoria Metro Station, where they had to enter the Underground City and search the passageways to find the basement of the Centre CDP building in order to find their next clue.
 This leg's first Detour was a choice between Slide It or Roll It. In Slide It, teams traveled to Glenfinnan Rink at McGill University and participated in the sport of curling. Each team member slid a granite stone  down the ice to the target. Once a team member got a stone into the house or touched the house with a total of four targets, they received their next clue. In Roll It, teams traveled to Morgan Arboretum and had to use lumberjack tools to roll four wooden logs along the  course in order to receive their next clue.
After completing the first Detour, teams were told to head to "American Pavilion" in which Montreal hosted Expo 67. They had to figure out that the next destination was the Montreal Biosphere. Once there, teams had to climb to the 5th floor in order to find their next clue.
 In this leg's first Roadblock, one team member had to successfully complete a flying trapeze maneuver known as a "catch" in order to receive their clue.
After completing the first Roadblock, teams had to travel to the Parc Olympique, drive a golf cart to the Stade Olympique, and then find the one door wide enough to drive through. Once inside the stadium, teams had to search among the 56,000 stadium seats for tickets on one of three charter flights departing the next morning to a mystery destination (Toronto). After teams found their departure times, they spent the night in the stadium.
After arriving in Toronto, teams had to drive to the CN Tower. Once there, teams took an elevator to the observation deck and used binoculars to locate their next clue at Polson Pier.
 This season's final Detour was a choice between Ship or Shoe. In Ship, teams had to sail across Toronto Harbour from Queens Quay to the schooner Kajama, where one team member had to climb  to the top of the mast and retrieve a nautical flag that they could exchange for their next clue. In Shoe, teams traveled to Bata Shoe Museum, where they had to choose a pair of shoes and search among 100 women for the one woman who fit the shoes in order to receive their next clue.
Teams were directed to Whirlpool Jet Boat Tours on the Canadian side of Niagara Gorge, where they had to choose a jet boat and ride up the gorge to a buoy where they found their next clue. Teams then had to travel by boat to Joseph Davis State Park in Lewiston, New York in order to find their next clue.
 In this season's final Roadblock, either team member who did not perform the first Roadblock had to assemble a giant 71-piece jigsaw puzzle map of North America and Central America. Once the puzzle was complete, teams could proceed to the nearby finish line.
Additional notes
Teams were provided tickets for a flight from Billings, Montana, to Montreal, but they were under no obligation to use them.
Leg 11 was a double leg that aired as a special two-hour episode.
After the season ended, CBS hosted the "Final Amazing Challenge" on the official website where the Bransen and Weaver families competed for a GMC Yukon XL. Using the completed map from the final Roadblock, teams ran out to clue boxes to retrieve cutouts, each representing tasks they performed on the race, and placed them on the associated part of the map. This challenge was won by the Bransen Family.

Reception

Critical response
Fans, critics, and racers were negative over the format changes implemented in this edition of The Amazing Race. The main issues were the lack of international travel and watered-down challenges tailored to families, and the expanded cast also made it more difficult to develop individual story lines. Dalton Ross of Entertainment Weekly commented that "Half the fun of The Amazing Race has always been watching the inter- and intra-couple bickering that goes with being chronically late and lost in a foreign land. Seeing parents yell at their children in exotic New Jersey? Not so fun". Robert Bianco of USA Today shared similar opinions, adding that "the idea of being trapped in the back seat for a forced cross-country family drive comes closer to a nightmare relived than a dream come true." Linda Holmes of Television Without Pity called the decision to have 40 contestants "baffling" and was disappointed with the tasks and locations on this season. Scott Pierce of Deseret News wrote "this 'Family Edition' of 'Amazing Race' is by far my least favorite. None of the families really seemed worth rooting for and the competition has been watered down to something less than scintillating to accommodate the family element." In 2016, this season was ranked last out of the first 27 seasons by the Rob Has a Podcast Amazing Race correspondents. Conversely in 2021, Val Barone of TheThings ranked the Family Edition as the show's 10th best season. Racers were also disappointed that they did not have a chance to travel to more exotic locations; in one episode Marion Paolo commented "What are we going to Phoenix, Arizona for? I want to go to New Zealand!" – a statement that also summed up the general opinion of the season.

In hindsight, the production team has admitted that the concept of a Family Edition "looked good on paper" but failed in execution, since child racers limited foreign travel for that season. Producers Bertram van Munster and Jonathan Littman doubt that the family format will be revived in the future.

Ratings
Canadian ratings

References

External links
Official website

 08
2005 American television seasons
Television shows filmed in New York (state)
Television shows filmed in New Jersey
Television shows filmed in Pennsylvania
Television shows filmed in Washington, D.C.
Television shows filmed in Virginia
Television shows filmed in South Carolina
Television shows filmed in Alabama
Television shows filmed in Mississippi
Television shows filmed in Louisiana
Television shows filmed in Panama
Television shows filmed in Costa Rica
Television shows filmed in Georgia (U.S. state)
Television shows filmed in Arizona
Television shows filmed in Utah
Television shows filmed in Wyoming
Television shows filmed in Montana
Television shows filmed in Minnesota
Television shows filmed in Quebec
Television shows filmed in Ontario